Moisés Delgado López (born 18 April 1994), known as Moi, is a Spanish professional footballer who plays for SD Ponferradina as a left-back.

Club career
Born in Utrera, Province of Seville, Andalusia, Moi played youth football with local club Sevilla FC. He made his senior debut with the reserves in the Segunda División B, his first appearance in the competition being on 24 February 2013 in a 3–2 home win against Cádiz CF.

In summer 2013, Moi was one of several youth players called by manager Unai Emery for preseason with the first team. On 11 May 2014, as the coach was resting several starters for the final of the UEFA Europa League, he made his La Liga debut, featuring the full 90 minutes in a 1–0 loss at Getafe CF.

Moi signed for FC Barcelona on 28 December 2015, and was immediately assigned to the reserves also in the third division. After achieving promotion in 2017, he failed to appear the following season and termated his contract on 19 January 2018.

On 30 January 2018, Moi joined another reserve team, Real Valladolid Promesas still in division three. On 14 May, he agreed to an extension until 2020 and was promoted to the main squad ahead of the upcoming campaign.

Moi played his first Spanish top-tier match with Valladolid on 20 January 2019, starting in a 1–0 away defeat to Levante UD. On 4 July, he extended his contract until 2022, and was loaned to second-tier Racing de Santander seven days later.

Moi scored his first professional goal on 19 January 2020, opening a 1–1 home draw against UD Las Palmas for Racing. On 1 September, after suffering relegation, he moved to CF Fuenlabrada in the same league and also in a temporary deal. This spell was cut short on 2 February 2021, and he joined SD Ponferradina also on loan just hours later.

On 28 August 2021, Moi terminated his contract with Valladolid, and remained unemployed for six months before signing for Primera División RFEF side UCAM Murcia CF on 31 January 2022. On 31 July, he returned to Ponfe and the second division.

References

External links

1994 births
Living people
People from Utrera
Sportspeople from the Province of Seville
Spanish footballers
Footballers from Andalusia
Association football defenders
La Liga players
Segunda División players
Segunda División B players
Primera Federación players
Sevilla Atlético players
Sevilla FC players
FC Barcelona Atlètic players
Real Valladolid Promesas players
Real Valladolid players
Racing de Santander players
CF Fuenlabrada footballers
SD Ponferradina players
UCAM Murcia CF players